Julian Manly Earls (born November 22, 1942) is an American physicist who worked for NASA for over forty years. He has been awarded two NASA Exceptional Achievement Medals and was inducted into the Presidential Rank Award of the Senior Executive Service by both Bill Clinton and George Bush.

Early life and education 
Earls was born in Portsmouth, Virginia to Ida and James Deberry Earls. His mother was a seamstress and his father worked on the railroads. His parents and first grade teacher encouraged him to work hard at school. He attended Crestwood High School in Chesapeake, Virginia. He took part in mathematics and science fairs whilst at high school, and was the first in his family to attend college. Earls studied physics at Norfolk State University, where he earned a bachelor's degree in 1964. He was initiated into Kappa Alpha Psi in 1963. He was encouraged to attend graduate school and applied to the University of Rochester School of Medicine, and completed a master's degree in 1965. 

After graduating he spent a summer at the Brookhaven National Laboratory. He was appointed as a medical physicist at the Lewis Research Center, who supported Earls in earning a doctoral degree in radiation physics at the University of Michigan. He was made Head of the section on Health Physics and Licensing, and served as the Radiological Safety Officer. In 1983 Earls founded the Development Fund for Black Students in Science and Technology, an endowment that provides financial support to black students at historically black colleges and universities.

Research and career 
After earning his doctorate Earls returned to NASA, where he worked in Health Physics whilst simultaneously working toward a business degree at Harvard University. He was made Chief of the Health, Safety, and Security Division in 1983 and promoted to Director of the Office of Health and Services in 1988.  He was made the Director of the Glenn Research Center in 2003, where he was responsible for technology, research and development, and systems development. This role involved Earls managing a budget of over a billion dollars and a work force of 4,500.  He was part of the launch team for Apollo 13 lunar program.

During his career at NASA Earls held many 'firsts', which included being the first African-American man to be appointed section head, office chief, division chief and deputy director. Earls wrote the two first NASA health physics and environmental resource guides. He also taught mathematics, physics and radiation biology at Capital University.

In 2005, after a career spanning forty years, Earls retired from NASA. After his retirement Earls joined Cleveland State University as Executive in Residence. The Alabama A&M University appointed Earls to the Board of Trustees in 2005. He also serves on the Board of Directors of ANSER.

Awards and honours 
His awards and honours include:

 1988 National Black College Alumni Hall of Fame Inductee
 1999 Inducted into the Senior Executive Service by Bill Clinton
 2004 1999 Inducted into the Senior Executive Service by George W. Bush
 2005 NASA Exceptional Achievement Medal
 2007 Howard University Honorary Degree
 2015 Cleveland State University Honorary Doctorate
 2017 Kappa Alpha Psi Laurel Wreath

Earls holds several honorary degrees, including a doctorate of science from the Vaughn College of Aeronautics and Technology, a degree in pedagogy from Nova Southeastern University and an honorary degree in humane letters from North Carolina A&T State University. The Dr. Julian M. Earls College Scholarship is awarded annually by the National Technical Association.

Personal life 
Earls is married to Zenobia, a Cleveland public school teacher, with whom he has two sons. Julian Earls, Jr, who is a neurologist, and Gregory Earls, a filmmaker who lives in Inglewood, California. Dr. Earls has two granddaughters. Earls is an athlete who has completed 27 marathons. In 2002 he was a torch bearer for the Salt Lake City Olympic Games.

References 

1942 births
Living people
Norfolk State University alumni
NASA people
Harvard Business School alumni
African-American engineers
University of Michigan alumni
People from Portsmouth, Virginia
21st-century African-American people
20th-century African-American people
University of Rochester alumni